Ogcodes is a genus of small-headed flies in the family Acroceridae. About 90 species have been described for the genus.

Subgenera and species
The genus is split into three subgenera: Ogcodes, Protogcodes and Neogcodes. Ogcodes is cosmopolitan in distribution, Protogcodes is endemic to Australia, and Neogcodes is restricted to the Nearctic.

Subgenus Ogcodes Latreille, 1796

Ogcodes acroventris Nartshuk, 1982
Ogcodes adaptatus Schlinger, 1960
Ogcodes alluaudi Becker, 1914
Ogcodes angustimarginatus Brunetti, 1920
Ogcodes asiaticus Nartshuk, 1975
Ogcodes argentinensis Schlinger, 1960
Ogcodes argigaster Schlinger, 1960
Ogcodes armstrongi Paramonov, 1957
Ogcodes ater White, 1915
Ogcodes basalis (Walker, 1852)
Ogcodes bigoti Nartshuk, 1982
Ogcodes boharti Schlinger, 1960
Ogcodes borneoensis Schlinger, 1971
Ogcodes borealis Cole, 1919
Ogcodes brasilensis Schlinger, 1960
Ogcodes brunneus (Hutton, 1881)
Ogcodes caffer Loew, 1857
Ogcodes canadensis Schlinger, 1960
Ogcodes canberranus Paramonov, 1957
Ogcodes castaneus Brunetti, 1926
Ogcodes chilensis Sabrosky, 1945
Ogcodes cingulatus Erichson, 1840
Ogcodes clavatus Becker, 1909
Ogcodes coffeatus Speiser, 1920
Ogcodes colei Sabrosky, 1948
Ogcodes colombiensis Schlinger, 1960
Ogcodes congoensis Brunetti, 1926
Ogcodes consimilis Brunetti, 1926
Ogcodes costalis (Walker, 1852)
Ogcodes crassitibialis Brunetti, 1926
Ogcodes croucampi Barraclough, 1997
Ogcodes deserticola Paramonov, 1957
Ogcodes diligens Osten Sacken, 1877
Ogcodes dispar (Macquart, 1855)
Ogcodes distinctus Brunetti, 1926
Ogcodes doddi Wandolleck, 1906
Ogcodes dusmeti Arias, 1920
Ogcodes esakii Ôuchi, 1942
Ogcodes etruscus Griffini, 1896
Ogcodes eugonatus Loew, 1872
†Ogcodes exotica Grimaldi, 1995
Ogcodes flavescens White, 1915
Ogcodes floridensis Sabrosky, 1948
Ogcodes formosus Loew, 1873
Ogcodes fortnumi Westwood, 1876
Ogcodes fratellus Brunetti, 1926
Ogcodes fraternus Brunetti, 1926
Ogcodes froggatti Schlinger in Schlinger & Jeffries, 1989
Ogcodes fumatus Erichson, 1846
Ogcodes fuscus Brunetti, 1912
Ogcodes gibbosus (Linnaeus, 1758)
Ogcodes glomerosus Paramonov, 1957
Ogcodes gressiti Schlinger, 1971
Ogcodes guttatus Costa, 1854
Ogcodes hennigi Schlinger, 1960
Ogcodes hirtus Sack, 1936
Ogcodes hungaricus (Szilády, 1941)
Ogcodes ignavus Westwood, 1876
Ogcodes insignis Brunetti, 1926
Ogcodes jacobaeus (Philippi, 1871)
Ogcodes jacutensis Pleske, 1930
Ogcodes javanus De Meijere, 1924
Ogcodes kunkunche Barahona-Segovia in Barahona-Segovia et al., 2020
Ogcodes kuscheli Sabrosky, 1951
Ogcodes lautereri Chvála, 1980
Ogcodes leptisoma Schlinger, 1960
Ogcodes lineatus Brunetti, 1926
Ogcodes longicolus Schlinger, 1971
Ogcodes luzonensis Schlinger, 1971
Ogcodes lucidus Paramonov, 1957
Ogcodes maai Schlinger, 1971
Ogcodes marginifasciatus Brunetti, 1926
Ogcodes melampus Loew, 1872
Ogcodes merens Nartshuk, 1982
Ogcodes neavei Brunetti, 1926
Ogcodes niger Cole, 1919
Ogcodes nigrinervis White, 1915
Ogcodes nigripes (Zetterstedt, 1838)
Ogcodes nigritarsis Shiraki, 1932
Ogcodes nitens (Hutton, 1901)
Ogcodes nyasae Brunetti, 1926
Ogcodes obscuripes Chvála, 1980
Ogcodes orientalis Schlinger, 1960
Ogcodes ottuc Nartshuk, 1982
Ogcodes pallidipennis Loew, 1865
Ogcodes pallipes Latreille in Olivier, 1812
Ogcodes pamiricus Nartshuk, 1982
Ogcodes philippinensis Schlinger, 1960
Ogcodes porteri Schlinger, 1953
Ogcodes pusillus Paramonov, 1957
Ogcodes pygmaeus White, 1915
Ogcodes reginae Trojan, 1956
Ogcodes respersus Seguy, 1935
Ogcodes rufoabdominalis Cole, 1919
Ogcodes rufomarginatus Brunetti, 1926
Ogcodes sabroskyi Schlinger, 1960
Ogcodes schembrii Chvála, 1980
Ogcodes sexmaculatus Brunetti, 1926
Ogcodes shewelli Sabrosky, 1948
Ogcodes shirakii Schlinger, 1960
Ogcodes similis Schlinger, 1960
Ogcodes taiwanensis Schlinger, 1971
Ogcodes tasmannicus Westwood, 1876
Ogcodes tenuipes Paramonov, 1957
Ogcodes triangularis Sabrosky, 1945
Ogcodes trifasciatus De Meijere, 1915
Ogcodes trilineatus Brunetti, 1926
Ogcodes variegatus Brunetti, 1926
Ogcodes varius Latreille in Olivier, 1812
Ogcodes victoriensis Brunetti, 1926
Ogcodes vittisternum Sabrosky, 1948
Ogcodes waterhousei Paramonov, 1957
Ogcodes wilsoni Paramonov, 1957
Ogcodes zonatus Erichson, 1840

Subgenus Protogcodes Schlinger, 1960
Ogcodes hirtifrons Paramonov, 1957
Ogcodes paramonovi Schlinger, 1960
Subgenus Neogcodes Schlinger, 1960
Ogcodes albiventris Johnson, 1904

The following species are synonyms:
 Ogcodes darwinii Westwood, 1876: synonym of Ogcodes basalis (Walker, 1852)
 Ogcodes fumatus Froggatt, 1907 (preoccupied by O. fumatus Erichson, 1846): renamed to Ogcodes froggatti Schlinger in Schlinger & Jeffries, 1989
 Ogcodes limbatus Bigot, 1888 (preoccupied by Henops limbatus Meigen, 1822, now Ogcodes pallipes Latreille in Olivier, 1812): renamed to Ogcodes bigoti Nartshuk, 1982

References

Acroceridae
Nemestrinoidea genera